Precis rauana, the montane commodore, is a butterfly in the family Nymphalidae. It is found in Nigeria, from Cameroon to the Democratic Republic of the Congo and in Uganda, Kenya, Tanzania and Zambia. The habitat consists of forests.

Both sexes are attracted to flowers.

The larvae feed on Plastostema and Plectranthus species.

Subspecies
Precis rauana rauana (Democratic Republic of the Congo, western Kenya, eastern Uganda, north-western Tanzania, Zambia)
Precis rauana silvicola Schultz, 1916 (eastern Nigeria, Cameroon, Democratic Republic of the Congo, western Uganda)

References

Butterflies described in 1898
Junoniini
Butterflies of Africa
Taxa named by Henley Grose-Smith